Jindeng Temple is a Buddhist temple located in Xingcheng Town of Changzhi, Shanxi, China. It was built in the steep precipices and cliffs in Beiquan Village,  to the northeast of Pingshun County. The temple is renowned for its grottoes, rock and statues of Buddha.

History
The original temple dates back to the 6th century, in the Northern Qi (550–577). At that time, it initially called "Baoyan Temple".

In the temple there are 14 Buddhist niches, 37 Buddhist shrines, and over 500 statues of Buddha carved from 1504 to 1565.

In June 2006, it was listed among the sixth group of "Major National Historical and Cultural Sites in Shanxi" by the State Council of China.

Architecture
The existing main buildings include the Hall of Water and Land, Hall of Grand Buddha, Hall of Lord Guan, Pavilion of Juxian, and Pavilion of Ksitigarbha.

Gallery

References

Buddhist temples in Shanxi
Buildings and structures in Changzhi
Tourist attractions in Changzhi